Jowkan (also Romanized as Jowkān, Jookan, and Jovakān; also known as Jowvakān) is a village in Khvajehei Rural District, Meymand District, Firuzabad County, Fars Province, Iran. At the 2006 census, its population was 293, in 72 families.

References 

Populated places in Firuzabad County